Sir Edmund Henry Knowles Lacon, 3rd Baronet (14 August 1807 – 2 December 1888) was an English businessman and liberal Conservative politician who sat in the House of Commons in two periods between 1852 and 1885.

Early life
Lacon was the son of Sir Edmund Knowles Lacon, 2nd Baronet, and his wife Eliza Beecroft, daughter of Thomas Beecroft of Saxthorpe Hall. He was educated at Eton College and Emmanuel College, Cambridge. In 1839 he inherited the baronetcy on the death of his father.

Business career
Lacon became a brewer and banker at Great Yarmouth. He was one of the original shareholders in the Yarmouth & Norwich Railway in 1842 which was Norfolk's first railway. He was later a director of the Yarmouth & Haddiscoe Railway and the East Suffolk Railway. He was also Chairman of the Great Yarmouth & Stalham Light Railway which later became part of the Midland & Great Northern Joint Railway.

Military career
He was appointed Lieutenant Colonel commanding the East Norfolk Militia on 16 March 1860 and of the 1st Norfolk Administrative Battalion of Artillery Volunteers on 2 December 1864. He later became Honorary Colonel of both units' successors, the 4th Battalion, Norfolk Regiment and the 1st Norfolk Artillery Volunteers (31 December 1881).

Political career
Lacon was elected as a Member of Parliament (MP) for Great Yarmouth at the 1852 general election and held the seat until his defeat in 1857. He regained the seat in 1859 and held it until the seat was disenfranchised for corruption at the 1868 general election. At the 1868 general election he was elected instead as MP for North Norfolk. He held that seat until the 1885 general election, when he did not stand again.

Public life
He was a Deputy Lieutenant and JP for Norfolk, a JP for Suffolk and High Steward of Yarmouth.

Family life
On 23 March 1839 Lacon married Eliza Georgiana Hammet (d. 31 March 1881), daughter of James Esdaile Hammet of Battersea, and they had six children:
 Edmund Broughton Knowles Lacon (9 May 1842 – 11 August 1899), who succeeded his father as 4th Baronet
 Thomas Beecroft Ussher Lacon (24 February 1845 – 28 February 1899), whose eldest son, Edmund Beecroft Francis Heathcote Lacon, succeeded as 5th Baronet, and whose third son, Harry Reginald Dunbar Lacon, married Hilda Mary Slayter, a Titanic survivor.
 Henry Sidney Hammett Lacon (December 1847–30 June 1900)
 Ernest De Montesquiou Lacon (1 May 1850 – 31 May 1936)
 Georgina Lacon, (d. 4 April 1933) married Major-General Charles Henry Gordon 
 Eliza Walpole Lacon (d. 22 January 1928) married Colonel Henry Goring Ravenhill

Lacon died at the age of 81.

Arms

References

External links

1807 births
1888 deaths
Conservative Party (UK) MPs for English constituencies
UK MPs 1880–1885
UK MPs 1852–1857
UK MPs 1859–1865
UK MPs 1865–1868
UK MPs 1868–1874
UK MPs 1874–1880
People educated at Eton College
Alumni of Emmanuel College, Cambridge
Deputy Lieutenants of Norfolk
Baronets in the Baronetage of the United Kingdom
British Militia officers
Politics of the Borough of Great Yarmouth
People from Great Yarmouth